Chmielewo  (German Chmielewen, 1938–1945 Talau) is a village in the administrative district of Gmina Orzysz, within Pisz County, Warmian-Masurian Voivodeship, in northern Poland.

References

Chmielewo